Nababan Abdon is the recipient of the 2017 Ramon Magsaysay Award and it was awarded for his courage and advocacy that have become the voice and face for the Indigenous Peoples Alliance in Indonesia.

References

Living people
Year of birth missing (living people)
Ramon Magsaysay Award winners